The 24th South Carolina Infantry Regiment was a Confederate infantry regiment in the American Civil War.

History

Formation
The 24th South Carolina Infantry was formed in the Winter of 1861-1862. The first 6 companies, A-F, were commissioned by the Governor in Charleston, SC, while the last 4, G-K, where formed in Camp Lightwod in Columbia, SC. Two militia officer where chosen to lead the regiment, Colonel Clement H. Stevens of the 1st SC Militia Rifles and Lieutenant Colonel Ellison Capers of the 16th SC Militia. Most of the Companies were from Charleston, Edgefield, and Colleton, with some men hailing from Charleston, Anderson, and Beaufort.

Initial duty
First posted to Sullivan's Island, SC to defend Charleston Harbor, the 24th first fought at Secessionville. At the Battle of Secessionville, the 24th, under the command of General Johnson Hagood along with the Eutaw Battalion fought Yankee regiments like the famous 1st New York Engineer Regiment and Battery B, 3rd Rhode Island Heavy Artillery. After the Battle of Secessionville the 24th was transferred to Mississippi.

Transfer to Mississippi
In May 1863, the 24th joined Gist Brigade where it was engaged at Jackson. After the engagement at Jackson, Gist's Brigade was moved to the Army Of Tennessee. Where it fought in Tennessee, Georgia, and North Carolina. The 24th fought in campaigns like, the Vicksburg Campaign, Chickamauga Campaign and Atlanta Campaign. On 9 April 1865, the 24th was consolidated with the 16th South Carolina Infantry Regiment to form the 16/24th Consolidated Infantry Regiment.

Surrender
The 24th surrendered on April 26, 1865 with the rest of the Army of Tennessee.

See also
List of South Carolina Confederate Civil War units

Units and formations of the Confederate States Army from South Carolina
1861 establishments in South Carolina
Military units and formations established in 1861